Russian is one of the two official languages of Belarus (the other being Belarusian). Being dominant in the media, education and other areas of public life, Russian is de facto the main language of the country.

Distribution per 1897 census

After 1995 
In 1995, according to the results of the 1995 Belarusian Referendum, the Russian language was declared the second official language. According to the Belarus Census (2009),  41.5% of the Belarusian population declared Russian as their mother language and 70.2% declared Russian "the language spoken at home" (the second language-related question of the Census).

See also 
 Russians in Belarus 
 Demographics of Belarus
 Russification of Belarus

References

External links 
 Калита И. В. Современная Беларусь: языки и национальная идентичность. Ústí nad Labem, 2010, 300 s.
 Yu. Koryakov, A Typology of Linguistic Situations and Linguistic Situation in Belarus, a Ph.D. thesis, 2002, Moscow State University 

Belarus
Belarusian culture
Belarus–Russia relations
Russification
Russian language in Belarus